Alea was an epithet of the Greek goddess Athena, prominent in Arcadian mythology, under which she was worshiped at Alea, Mantineia and Tegea.   Alea was initially an independent goddess, but was eventually assimilated with Athena.  A statue of Athena Alea existed on the road from Sparta to Therapne.  Her most important sanctuary was the famous Temple of Athena Alea at Tegea.

Notes

References 

 Pausanias, Description of Greece with an English Translation by W.H.S. Jones, Litt.D., and H.A. Ormerod, M.A., in 4 Volumes. Cambridge, MA, Harvard University Press; London, William Heinemann Ltd. 1918. Online version at the Perseus Digital Library
 Pausanias, Graeciae Descriptio. 3 vols. Leipzig, Teubner. 1903.  Greek text available at the Perseus Digital Library.

External links
Temple of Athena Alea at Tegea at the Athena Museum

Epithets of Athena
Tegea
Greco-Roman relations in classical antiquity